The Mixed team relay of the 2021 UCI Road World Championships was a cycling event that took place on 22 September 2021 between Knokke-Heist and Brugge, Belgium. It was the second time the event had been held, as it replaced the men's and women's team time trial from previous editions.

Results

References

Mixed team relay
UCI Road World Championships – Mixed team relay